Ferrimonas sediminum is a Gram-negative and facultatively anaerobic bacterium from the genus of Ferrimonas which has been isolated from sediments of an amphioxus breeding zone from Qingdao in China.

References

Bacteria described in 2013
Alteromonadales